The Habitation and Logistics Outpost (HALO), also called the Minimal Habitation Module (MHM) and formerly known as the Utilization Module, is a scaled-down habitation module as part of the Lunar Gateway. It will be built by Northrop Grumman Innovation Systems. A single Falcon Heavy will launch HALO along with the PPE module and Halo Lunar Communication System, no earlier than November 2024.

Background 

Several concepts for the initial habitation module of a lunar orbital outpost had been developed under the Next Space Technologies for Exploration Partnerships 2 (NextSTEP-2) program. With the 2024 goal set by the Trump administration, NASA acknowledged it needed to leverage this program in order to meet the timelines set. In July 2019, NASA decided to sole source its design for the Minimal Habitation Module of the Lunar Gateway to Northrop Grumman Innovation Systems. The motivation to sole source was based on NASA's assessment that Northrop were the only existing NextSTEP-2 contractor with the designs and production capabilities to meet the module requirements and within the set timescale.

Northrop offered a minimalist 6.1-meter (20 feet) by 3-meter (9.8 feet) design based directly on the Enhanced Cygnus, as well as a larger 7-meter (22.9 feet) by 4.4-meter (14.4 feet) design also based on the Cygnus, to the outside of which radial docking ports, body-mounted radiators (BMRs), batteries and communications antennae will be added. Northrop Grumman Innovation Systems opted to build the minimalist design, which offered the advantage of component compatibility and expedited testing of life-support systems on existing Cygnus spacecraft.  On 5 June 2020, NASA awarded Northrop Grumman Innovation Systems a $187 million contract to complete the preliminary design of HALO. NASA signed a separate contract with Northrop for the fabrication of the HALO, and for integration with the Power and Propulsion Element (PPE), being built by Maxar, for US$935 million.

Design 
The HALO will form an initial scaled-down habitation module. Its primary purpose will be to fulfill the life-support requirements of visiting crew on Orion spacecraft and a space to allow preparations for lunar landing departure. It will feature a functional pressurized volume providing sufficient command, control and data handling capabilities, energy storage and power distribution, thermal control, communications and tracking capabilities, two axial and up to two radial docking ports, stowage volume, environmental control and life-support systems to augment the Orion spacecraft and support a crew of four for at least 30 days. The exterior of the HALO module will feature body-mounted radiators (BMRs), batteries and communications antennae will be added. One axial docking port will connect to the International logistics and habitat module (I-HAB) and one radial docking port is allocated for use by the Human Landing System. Batteries will be provided by the Japan Aerospace Exploration Agency (JAXA). These will provide power to the module prior to the deployment of the Power and Propulsion Element (PPE) solar arrays and during occultation of the Sun by the Earth and Moon. The Canadian Space Agency will be providing interfaces and base point for use by Canadarm 3.

Science 
HALO will host two scientific packages at launch aimed at improving the understanding of space weather and prediction models. The NASA-built Heliophysics Environmental and Radiation Measurement Experiment Suite and the ESA-built European Radiation Sensors Array (ERSA).

Heliophysics Environmental and Radiation Measurement Experiment Suite (HERMES)

HERMES will explore Earth's interaction with the solar wind and the behavior of the magnetotail. The hope is to build a better understanding on the causes of space-weather variability as driven by the Sun and modulated by the magnetosphere. The experiment Suite has three science goals: determine mechanisms of solar wind mass and energy transport; characterize energy, topology, and ion composition in the deep magnetotail; and establish observational capabilities of an on-board pathfinder payload measuring local space weather to support deep-space and long-term human exploration.

The suite will consist of four instruments. Fluxgate and Magneto-Inductive Magnetometers will measure Magnetic Field Vector. Built and supplied by Goddard Space Flight Center. Principal investigators from University of Michigan and Goddard Space Flight Center.

Miniaturized Electron pRoton Telescope (MERiT) to measure ion flux of energies between 1-190 MeV and electron flux of energies between 0.3 - 9 MeV.  Built, supplied and operated by Goddard Space Flight Center.

Electron Electrostatic Analyser (EEA) is an electron spectrometer and will measure flux, density, speed and temperature of lower energy electrons of less than 30 KeV. It is built, supplied and operated by Goddard Space Flight Center.

Solar Prove Analyser (SPAN-I)  is an ion spectrometer. It will measure the flux, density, speed, temperature and type of low energy ions with energies less than 40KeV. SPAN-I will be supplied and operated by University of California, Berkeley.

European Radiation Sensors Array (ERSA) 
The ESA built European Radiation Sensors Array (ERSA) will measure the effect and impact of the solar wind on astronauts and equipment. The suite will include the Influence sur les Composants Avancés des Radiations de l'Espace (ICARE-NG) to measure ionizing radiation; and the European Active Dosimeter to measure radiation energies.

See also 

 Zarya (Functional Cargo Block; FGB/ФГБ), the International Space Station power, propulsion, control, and storage, module

References

Lunar Gateway
2024 in spaceflight
Artemis program
Crewed spacecraft
Joint ventures
Missions to the Moon
NASA programs
NASA space stations
Spacecraft using halo orbits
Proposed space stations